Internationalism or Russification? is a book by Ukrainian writer and social activist Ivan Dziuba, written in September–December 1965.

Background

The immediate impetus for writing this work were political repressions that took place in Ukrainian SSR in 1965 against the Ukrainian intellectuals. In August and September 1965 in Kyiv, Lviv, Lutsk, Ivano-Frankivsk and Ternopil about three dozen of young Ukrainian intellectuals  were arrested. On September 4 in Kyiv during the premiere of the Sergei Parajanov's movie Shadows of Forgotten Ancestors poets Vasyl Stus and Ivan Dziuba called for protesting against political repression.

Content

In the work Internationalism or Russification?, written under the influence of those events, Dziuba analyzed from a Marxist position the national and cultural policy of the Soviet Union in Ukraine. The author sent his work to the first Secretary of the Central Committee of the Communist Party of Ukraine, Petro Shelest, and to the Head of the Ukrainian SSR government, Volodymyr Shcherbytsky, and its Russian translation - to the leadership of Communist Party of the Soviet Union (CPSU).

In Internationalism or Russification? Dziuba argued that during Joseph Stalin's rule the CPSU had moved to the positions of Russian chauvinism. His argumentation the author built largely on quotations from the works of Vladimir Lenin and party documents of the 1920s. He believed that the policy of the CPSU, particularly in Ukraine, contradicts with the fundamental interests of the Ukrainian people and contended that the solution is in returning  to Lenin's principles of national policy.

Spread of the book

The work Internationalism or Russification? spread in the samizdat, and in 1968 it was published abroad by the journal publisher Suchasnist.
Without permission and knowledge of the author the book was repeatedly issued outside of the Soviet Union in Ukrainian, English, Russian, Chinese French and Italian languages. In Ukraine, this work was legally published only in 1990 in the magazine Motherland (Вітчизна), and as a book it was first published in 1998.

Reaction of the Soviet government

The Soviet government declared Internationalism or Russification? to be an Anti-Soviet work, and its distribution, storage or even just reading to be a crime. Dziuba lost his job, he was expelled from the Writers' Union of Ukraine and faced harassment from the KGB, and in 1972 was jailed for 18 months.

See also

 Executed Renaissance
 List of Ukrainian-language writers
 Russification

References 
 Дзюба І. М. Інтернаціоналізм чи русифікація? Переднє слово
 Іван Дзюба «Інтернаціоналізм чи русифікація?» The book on litopys.org.ua (in Ukrainian)

Communism in Ukraine
History books about Ukraine
History books about the Soviet Union
Ukrainian non-fiction books
Russification
Internationalism
Ukrainian-language books
Book censorship in the Soviet Union
Censored books
Marxist books
Dissent
Linguistic rights
Nationalism and the arts
Cultural policy
Books about cultural politics
1965 non-fiction books
Samizdat publications
1965 in Ukraine